Barrelville (historically sometimes known as Pamosa) is an unincorporated community and census-designated place (CDP) in Allegany County, Maryland, United States. As of the 2010 census, it had a population of 73. It is located between Corriganville and Mount Savage, where an 1804 road from Pennsylvania intersected the legendary Turkey Foot Road. Jennings Run flows from Mount Savage to Barrelville, where another tributary that runs south from Wellersburg, Pennsylvania, joins Jennings Run.

Demographics

References

Census-designated places in Allegany County, Maryland
Census-designated places in Maryland